Marshville is a town in Union County, North Carolina, United States. Its population was 2,402 at the 2010 census. Marshville is known as the birthplace of country music singer Randy Travis.

Geography
Marshville is located at  (34.988458, -80.367845).

Demographics

2020 census

As of the 2020 United States census, there were 2,522 people, 889 households, and 609 families residing in the town.

2010 census
As of the census of 2010, there were 2,402 people, 809 households, and 581 families residing in the town. The population density was 1,151.4 people per square mile (444.5/km2). There were 868 housing units at an average density of 423.5 per square mile (163.5/km2). The racial makeup of the town was 48% White, 45.3% African American, 0.06% Native American, 0.20% Asian, 4% from other races, and 1.9% from two or more races. Hispanic or Latino of any race were 3.22% of the population.

There were 812 households, out of which 37.8% had children under the age of 18 living with them, 50.7% were married couples living together, 15.9% had a female householder with no husband present, and 28.8% were non-families. 24.5% of all households were made up of individuals, and 11.3% had someone living alone who was 65 years of age or older. The average household size was 2.79 and the average family size was 3.36.

In the town the population was spread out, with 28.8% under the age of 18, 8.2% from 18 to 24, 29.2% from 25 to 44, 19.3% from 45 to 64, and 14.5% who were 65 years of age or older. The median age was 34 years. For every 100 females, there were 88.6 males. For every 100 females age 18 and over, there were 81.0 males.

The median income for a household in the town was $36,140, and the median income for a family was $42,589. Males had a median income of $30,039 versus $21,413 for females. The per capita income for the town was $15,498. About 8.3% of families and 10.9% of the population were below the poverty line, including 9.3% of those under age 18 and 13.1% of those age 65 or over.

Culture
Marshville is the site of the Randy Travis Festival, an annual street fair and carnival that takes place every fall.

Parts of the 1985 Oscar-nominated movie The Color Purple were filmed in Marshville. The movie was directed by Steven Spielberg and its cast included Oprah Winfrey and Whoopi Goldberg.

In June 2012 the Marshville Museum And Cultural Center was opened with exhibits on the history of Marshville, the surrounding area, and its residents.

Infamous for the highest water bills in the county

Notable people
 Joshua Park, actor and Theatre World Award winner (The Adventures of Tom Sawyer).
 Randy Travis, country & western musician and actor.
 K-Ci & JoJo, R&B singers and members of Jodeci
 Judy Jordan, author, National Book Critics Circle Award for Poetry

References

Towns in North Carolina
Towns in Union County, North Carolina